Prunus gracilis, called the Oklahoma plum, sour plum, and sand plum, is a species of Prunus native to the south-central United States.

Description 
It grows in clusters and thickets. It is hermaphroditic and pollinated by insects.

Taxonomy 
The specific epithet Gracilis refers to 'slender branches'.

Distribution and habitat
It is natively found in various states of the United States, including Alabama, southwestern Arkansas, southeastern Colorado, Kansas, northwestern Louisiana, eastern New Mexico, Oklahoma, and Texas.

It is found growing in fence rows, open woodlands, woodlands edge, forest openings, hillsides, slopes, sandy roadsides, upland thickets and waste places.

Uses 
Its red fruits are considered poor for eating, but Native Americans dried them for consumption during winter.

References

External links
 
 photo of herbarium specimen at Missouri Botanical Garden, collected in Republic of Texas in 1844
 
 

gracilis
Flora of the United States
Plants described in 1845
gracilis